Joseph Montgomery, Jr. (born June 8, 1976) is a former professional American football running back.  He played professionally for three seasons in the National Football League (NFL) with the New York Giants and Carolina Panthers.  He played college football at Ohio State University and was drafted in the second round of the 1999 NFL Draft.

References

1976 births
Living people
American football running backs
Carolina Panthers players
New York Giants players
Ohio State Buckeyes football players
People from Oak Lawn, Illinois
People from Robbins, Illinois
Players of American football from Illinois